Jane Fraser (born 1942) is an American philanthropist, author, editor, businesswoman, and the President of The Stuttering Foundation of America, a non-profit charitable organization working toward the prevention and improved treatment of stuttering.

Early life
Fraser was born in Memphis, Tennessee, in 1942. Her father, Malcolm Fraser, was one of the founders of Genuine Parts Company and later founded the Stuttering Foundation of America after living with stuttering his entire life.

In 1964, Fraser received her bachelor's degree in Russian and linguistics from Bryn Mawr College in Bryn Mawr, Pennsylvania. Fraser later attended the University of Strasbourg in France receiving her M.S. in Russian in 1966.

She worked as an interpreter and translator for the National Assembly of France in Paris, France, as well as served as editor and translator for the Institut Gustave Roussy until 1980.

President of the Stuttering Foundation of America
Beginning in 1981, Fraser has served as President of the Stuttering Foundation of America.

Since the beginning of her presidency, the foundation's endowment has grown from $3,000,000 to $17,000,000. 
The Stuttering Foundation has also added a toll-free hotline and website. 
Under Fraser's presidency, the foundation has published 24 books and 13 brochures for stutterers.

Author and editor
Fraser co-authored “If Your Child Stutters: A Guide for Parents” for the Stuttering Foundation in 1988.

She also edited “Counseling Stutterers” in 1981 and “Stuttering Therapy: Transfer and Maintenance” in 1982.

Other affiliations
Fraser served as Member of the Advisory Council for the National Institute on Deafness and Other Communicative Disorders, at the National Institutes of Health from 1996 until 2000.

She also was a member of the board of trustees for Hamilton College from 1991 until 1997.

She is a member of the board of trustees for the Alexander Hamilton Institute for the Study of Western Civilization.

In addition, she serves as a member of the advisory board for the Institute for Effective Governance in Washington D.C. and a member of the Conservation Council at Panthera Corporation.

Awards and honors
Fraser was named Executive of the Year by the Non-Profit Times for 2008–2009. Fraser is an Honorary Fellow of the Royal College of Speech and Language Therapists.

Corporation

American philanthropists
American non-fiction writers
Stuttering Foundation Presidents
American women in business
American nonprofit executives
1942 births
Living people
Women nonprofit executives
American women non-fiction writers
21st-century American women